Eskibalta is a village in the Yedisu District, Bingöl Province, Turkey. The village is populated by Circassians and Kurds and had a population of 122 in 2021.

References 

Villages in Yedisu District
Kurdish settlements in Bingöl Province